Steroid reductases are reductase enzymes that are involved in steroid biosynthesis and metabolism. They include:

 5α-Reductase
 5β-Reductase

See also
 Steroidogenic enzyme

References

Oxidoreductases